"Some Like It Hoth" is the 13th television episode of the fifth season of ABC's Lost. The 99th episode of the show overall, "Some Like It Hoth" aired on April 15, 2009, on ABC in the United States. The episode was written by co-producer Melinda Hsu Taylor and "Eggtown" writer Greggory Nations and directed by Jack Bender. The title is a reference to the film Some Like it Hot and the fictional planet Hoth in the Star Wars universe.

In 1977, Miles Straume (Ken Leung) and Hugo "Hurley" Reyes (Jorge Garcia) deliver a package to a top Dharma official. Meanwhile, a security breach is being suspected after young Ben has disappeared. In flashbacks, Miles is recruited by Naomi Dorrit (Marsha Thomason) to go to the island.

Plot

Flashbacks
As a child, Miles discovers that he can hear the voices of dead people, so long as their bodies are nearby. When his mother, Lara (Leslie Ishii), is dying of cancer several years later, Miles questions her about his father. She tells him that his father died when Miles was still a baby and that he never cared about her or Miles.  Miles has been employed by a man (Dean Norris) to speak with his dead son. Since the boy's body was cremated, Miles lies to the man and says that the boy knew his father loved him. Some time later, Miles is approached by Naomi Dorrit (Marsha Thomason) who, after ascertaining that Miles is not a fraud, offers him $1.6 million to go to the island on the freighter. He agrees; however, he is later kidnapped by a group of people who claim that the owner of the freighter, Charles Widmore (Alan Dale), is on the "wrong team." Miles says he will not go to the island if they can provide him double the money ($3.2 million, the amount Miles asks for in "Eggtown"). Their leader, Bram (Brad William Henke), who is later a passenger on Ajira Airways Flight 316, asks Miles the question, "What lies in the shadow of the statue?" Miles cannot answer, so he tells Miles that he will not be ready to go to the island until he can. They then let Miles go. Miles later returns the man's money, saying that he lied and that the man should have told his son that he loved him before he died.

1977
Following the events of "Whatever Happened, Happened", Kate Austen (Evangeline Lilly) and James "Sawyer" Ford (Josh Holloway) return from bringing Ben Linus (Sterling Beaumon) to the island's native population, known as the Others. Kate returns to the infirmary where Juliet Burke (Elizabeth Mitchell) had been treating Ben for a gunshot wound. Ben's father, Roger (Jon Gries), arrives and notices that Ben has gone missing. Sometime later, Kate approaches Roger, who has been drinking, and tells him that everything will be okay. He grows suspicious of her and demands to know what happened to Ben. He later tells Jack Shephard (Matthew Fox) of his suspicions, leading Jack to tell Sawyer and Juliet. After dismissing Jack, Sawyer is confronted by Phil (Patrick Fischler), who has seen the security video of Sawyer taking Ben. Sawyer knocks Phil unconscious and tells Juliet to get some rope to tie him up.

Miles Straume (Ken Leung), meanwhile, is sent by Horace Goodspeed (Doug Hutchison), the Dharma Initiative's leader on the island, to the construction site of the Swan Station to retrieve a dead body and bring it to Dr. Pierre Chang (François Chau), Miles's father, at the Orchid Station. Before he can bring the body to Dr. Chang, Hugo "Hurley" Reyes tries to take the van containing the body, in order to deliver food to the Orchid Station. Since they are both going to the same place and there are no other vans available, Miles reluctantly agrees to let Hurley accompany him. On the way, Hurley finds the body and realizes that Miles is able to communicate with dead people, an ability Hurley also possesses. After discussing the differences between their abilities, they arrive at the Orchid Station, where Miles transfers the body to Dr. Chang, who, after disposing of the body, requires a ride to the construction site. After dropping him off, Miles discovers that Hurley is writing the screenplay for the 1980 film The Empire Strikes Back, from memory, in order to give it to George Lucas. Hurley compares Miles's relationship with his father to the relationship between Luke Skywalker and Darth Vader, as well to the relationship between Hurley and his father. Hurley says that the best thing he ever did was forgive his father for abandoning him and suggests Miles do the same. Miles goes to Dr. Chang's house and briefly observes him interacting with his three-month-old self. However, Dr. Chang is on his way out and takes the older Miles to the dock, where a submarine is arriving with Dharma scientists, among whom is Daniel Faraday (Jeremy Davies). Faraday recognizes Miles and mentions that it has been a while since they have seen each other.

References

External links
"Some Like It Hoth" at ABC

Lost (season 5) episodes
2009 American television episodes